Simca (Société Industrielle de Mécanique et de Carrosserie Automobile) is a French automobile manufacturer.

SIMCA or Simca may also refer to:

 Soft independent modelling of class analogies, a statistical method
 Sugud Islands Marine Conservation Area, a Category II Marine Protected Area in Labuk-Sugud District, Malaysia
 Simone Beck, French cookbook author and cooking teacher nicknamed Simca
 Simca, a fictional character in the anime/manga series Air Gear

See also
 Filip Šimka, Slovakian ice hockey player
 Simka Dahblitz-Gravas, a character in the TV series Taxi